Tacuate may refer to:

Tacuate people
Tacuate language